Michael Harring (born January 31, 1979 in Oak Harbor, Washington) is an American independent filmmaker, sometimes associated with the independent film movement known as "Mumblecore". His films include Cardinal (2001), Driving Around, Following Strangers (2005), Small Little Thing (2006), and the feature The Mountain, the River and the Road (2009).

Biography
Michael Harring was born in Oak Harbor, Washington, and currently resides in Seattle, WA.

Filmography (as director)
The Mountain, the River and the Road (2009)
Small Little Thing (2006)
Driving Around, Following Strangers (2005)
Cardinal (2001)

References

Seattle Weekly: Local Sightings Film Festival: An I-5 Road Trip and Other New Movies Debut
Seattle Times
Michael Harring's MySpace Page

External links
Michael Harring Official Site
Welcome to Kernville: Official site for "The Mountain, the River, and the Road
"Small Little Thing" on IMDb
"Driving Around, Following Strangers" on IMDb
Sleepy Eyes of Death - Final Heart Beats Black on YouTube

Living people
1979 births
People from Oak Harbor, Washington
Film directors from Washington (state)